Shingle may refer to:

Construction
Roof shingles or wall shingles, including:
Wood shingle
Shake (shingle), a wooden shingle that is split from a bolt, with a more rustic appearance than a sawed shingle
Quercus imbricaria, or shingle oak, a wood used for shingles
Asbestos shingle, roof or wall shingles made with asbestos-cement board
Asphalt shingle, a common residential roofing material in North America
Roof tiles, made of ceramic or other materials
Slate shingle, roof or wall shingles made of slate
Solar shingle, a solar collector designed to look like a roof shingle
Shingle style architecture, a plain American house style with little ornamentation

Science and technology
Shingles (Herpes zoster), a disease of the nerves
Shingling (metallurgy), the process of consolidating iron or steel with a hammer during production
Shingle back (Trachydosaurus rugosus), a species of skink found in Australia
Shingled magnetic recording (SMR), a magnetic storage data recording technology used in hard disk drives
In text mining, a token-level n-gram

Other uses
Shingle beach, especially in Europe, a beach composed of pebbles and cobbles
Shingle bob, a short hairstyle for women in the mid-1920s
Shingle Cove, Antarctica
Shingle dancing, a form of solo dancing akin to tap dancing, of African American origin
Shingle Springs, California, formerly known as Shingle
"Shit on a shingle", slang for chipped beef on toast
The Shingles, a sandbank near the landform called The Needles, on the Isle of Wight